Suriname competed in the 2011 Parapan American Games.

Competitors
The following table lists Suriname's delegation per sport and gender.

Athletics

Men

References

Nations at the 2011 Parapan American Games
2011 in Surinamese sport
Suriname at the Pan American Games